Thuridilla lineolata  is a species of sea slug, a sacoglossan, a marine gastropod mollusk in the family Plakobranchidae. It is an Indo-Pacific species that lives in or near coral reefs and eats algae.

Distribution and habitat
This species occurs in the tropical West-Pacific, mainly in Indonesia and the Philippines.
It lives on the external slope of coral reefs, on top of the reef, and in the lagoon.

Description
This species can be up to 3 cm in size. The body is partially covered by the fold of the lateral parapodia. The mantle is bright blue, and the edges of the parapodia are framed by two lines: a fine black one and an orange one on the external side.

The smooth rhinophores and the oral cavity are also marked with a black line and with an orange band.

Biology
This species is benthic and diurnal. Because of its aposematic coloration, it crawls around to feed in the daylight. Its diet is based on algae.

References
 P.L. Beesley, G.J.B. Ross & A. Wells,"Mollusca-The southern synthesis", vol.5,CSIRO,1998,
 David Behrens, "Nudibranch behaviour", Newworld Publication INC., 2005, 
 Gary Cobb & Richard Willan, "Undersea jewels- a colour guide to nudibranchs", Australian Biological Resources Study, 2006,

External links 
 Sea Slug Forum, Thuridilla lineolata
 Worms, Thuridilla lineolata

External links
 

Plakobranchidae
Gastropods described in 1905